III: Tabula Rasa or Death and the Seven Pillars is the final release by Dutch occult-themed rock group The Devil's Blood. The album is made of unfinished demos recorded at the home studio of Selim Lemouchi.

Track listing

Personnel
Album personnel adapted from Allmusic.

 Selim Lemouchi "SL" - composer, bass, guitar, engineering, programming
 Farida Lemouchi "F. the Mouth of Satan" - vocals

References

External links
 

2013 albums
The Devil's Blood albums
Metal Blade Records albums